Ophrys holosericea, the late spider orchid, is a species of flowering plant in the family Orchidaceae, native to western and central Europe and the Mediterranean region. There has been considerable confusion about the identity of this species and the correct spelling of its name.

Subtaxa
The following subtaxa are accepted:

Ophrys holosericea subsp. andria  – Aegean Islands
Ophrys holosericea subsp. apulica  – Eastern and southern Italy, southern Sicily, southern Croatia
Ophrys holosericea subsp. biancae  – Sicily
Ophrys holosericea subsp. candica  – Italy, Sicily, East Aegean Islands, Greece, Crete, Turkey
Ophrys holosericea subsp. chestermanii  – Sardinia
Ophrys holosericea nothosubsp. delfuocoi  – Italy
Ophrys holosericea subsp. elatior  – Eastern France, Switzerland, southwestern Germany
Ophrys holosericea subsp. gracilis  – Italy, Istria
Ophrys holosericea subsp. holosericea – Entire range
Ophrys holosericea subsp. lacaitae  – southern Italy, Sicily, Malta, Vis
Ophrys holosericea subsp. oblita  – Southern Greece, East Aegean Islands, Turkey, Lebanon/Syria, Israel 
Ophrys holosericea subsp. oxyrrhynchos  – southern Italy, Sicily, Malta
Ophrys holosericea subsp. pallidiconi  – South southwest Turkey
Ophrys holosericea subsp. parvimaculata  – South-central and southern Italy
Ophrys holosericea nothosubsp. robertidarum  – Italy

References

holosericea
Flora of Great Britain
Flora of Central Europe
Flora of France
Flora of Corsica
Flora of Southeastern Europe
Flora of Western Asia
Flora of Libya
Plants described in 1967
Taxa named by Nicolaas Laurens Burman